Bay City is an album by David Thomas and Foreigners, released in 2000.

Production
The album was recorded in Denmark, over a period of three years.  Its title is an homage to the Bay City of Raymond Chandler's writings.

Critical reception
CMJ New Music Monthly wrote that Thomas "has to be one of the most soulful abstractionists going, and these three Danish improvisers are as simpatico as any band he's been with."

Track listing
All tracks composed by David Thomas, Peter Ole Jørgensen, Per Buhl Acs and Jørgen Teller
"Clouds of You"  – 4:24
"White Room"  – 3:37
"Black Coffee Dawn"  – 4:35
"Salt"  – 5:58
"Nobody Lives On The Moon"  – 2:06
"Charlotte"  – 3:52
"The Doorbell"  – 2:51
"15 Seconds"  – 5:19
"The Radio Talks To Me"  – 3:57
"Shaky Hands"  – 4:56
"Black Rain"  – 5:47
"Turpentine"  – 2:34
"White Room #4"  – 3:36

Personnel
David Thomas and Foreigners
David Thomas - vocals
Jørgen Teller - guitar, Casio synthesizer
Per Buhl Acs - bass, clarinet, melodica
Peter Ole Jørgensen - drums, percussion, steel drums, vibraphone

References

David Thomas (musician) albums
2000 albums